Mercy (Spanish: Misericordia) is a 1953 Mexican drama film directed by Zacarías Gómez Urquiza and starring Sara García, Carmen Montejo and Anita Blanch.

Cast
 Sara García as Benigna  
 Carmen Montejo as Juliana  
 Anita Blanch as Doña Francisca Zapata y Pruneda  
 Ángel Garasa as Don Carchito  
 Manuel Dondé as Yuco  
 José Baviera as Don Romualdo, sacerdote  
 Alberto Mariscal as Antonio  
 Francisco Reiguera as Don Carlos Moreno Trujillo 
 Beatriz Saavedra as Obdulia  
 Ana Bertha Lepe as Celedonia 
 Lupe Carriles as Limosnera chismosa  
 Manuel Casanueva as Notario  
 Enedina Díaz de León as Doña Florita, limosnera  
 Pedro Elviro as Limosnero  
 Gilberto González as Limosnero  
 Jesús Gómez as Policía  
 Leonor Gómez as Limosnera  
 Isabel Herrera as Mujer sale iglesia  
 Ramón Sánchez as Herrero  
 Paz Villegas as Doña Bernarda

References

Bibliography 
 María Luisa Amador. Cartelera cinematográfica, 1950-1959. UNAM, 1985.

External links 
 

1953 films
1953 drama films
Mexican drama films
1950s Spanish-language films
Films based on works by Benito Pérez Galdós
Films directed by Zacarías Gómez Urquiza
Mexican black-and-white films
1950s Mexican films